Nikita Borisovich Timoshin (born 22 April 1988) is a Russian former professional football player.

Club career
He made his Russian Football National League debut for FC Avangard Kursk on 31 March 2010 in a game against FC Khimki.

External links
 

1988 births
Living people
Russian footballers
Association football defenders
FC Asmaral Moscow players
FC Sokol Saratov players
PFC Spartak Nalchik players
FC Shinnik Yaroslavl players
Footballers from Makhachkala
FC Fakel Voronezh players
FC Tosno players
FC Baltika Kaliningrad players
FC Avangard Kursk players